Shandre Alvida Fritz (born 21 July 1985) is a South African former cricketer and current match referee. She played as a right-handed batter and right-arm medium bowler. She appeared in 59 One Day Internationals and 26 Twenty20 Internationals for South Africa between 2003 and 2014. She played domestic cricket for Western Province and KwaZulu-Natal.

She was given the captaincy of South Africa in 2007, aged 21, but after an accident at a swimming pool in which she damaged her back, she missed the series against the Netherlands and Pakistan, with Cri-Zelda Brits captaining the side instead.

Fritz became the first South African woman to score a century in a Twenty20 Internationals when she scored 116* against Netherlands at the 2010 ICC Women's Cricket Challenge.

In August 2019, Cricket South Africa appointed her to their Match Referees Panel for the 2019–20 cricket season. In January 2021, she refereed in her first WODI matches, for all three fixtures between South Africa and Pakistan at the Kingsmead Cricket Ground.

References

External links
 
 

1985 births
Living people
Cricketers from Cape Town
South African women cricketers
South Africa women One Day International cricketers
South Africa women Twenty20 International cricketers
Western Province women cricketers
KwaZulu-Natal Coastal women cricketers
South African women referees and umpires